Mangalia Marina is a harbour for yachts and small boats (up to 18 m long) located on the Black Sea coast. It is the most modern tourist harbour in Romania.

History
The marina was built between 2006–2008 with the help of a joint grant of 4,071,365.77 euros from the European Union (Phare 2004/016-772.04.01.01.01 - Large Regional Infrastructure Projects scheme) and a City Council and City Hall of Mangalia contribution of 651,418.52 euro.

Location, description
The marina is at only a 2-day sailing trip from the port of Odessa, in Ukraine. It is within 1-day sailing distance to Varna, Bulgaria and a couple of hours to both Constanţa and the Danube Delta. Enjoying ideal conditions for mooring and vessel maintenance, the Mangalia Marina is the starting point for short coastal trips in the immediate vicinity. Stopovers in Vama Veche, 2 Mai, Limanu, Venus, Neptun, Olimp, Costinești, Eforie Sud, Eforie Nord, Agigea, Constanţa, Mamaia and Midia all provide stopover options. Larger boats can follow longer coastal shipping routes within the perimeter Istanbul-Varna-Mangalia-Odessa-Yalta. Short boat tours are also available.

The Mangalia Marina has a total capacity of 146 mooring places. 

Together with the Varna Marina from Bulgaria, the Mangalia Marina co-hosts the BMW Black Sea International Regatta, which is organized annually by Romania Yacht Club, Bulgaria LZ Yachting 1991 and Odessa International Yacht Club.

Image Gallery

See also
 Port of Mangalia

References

Marinas
Ports and harbours of the Black Sea
Mangalia
Tourism in Romania
Tourist attractions in Constanța County
Buildings and structures in Constanța County